Enteromius pumilus is a species of ray-finned fish in the genus Enteromius from Sudan and Ethiopia, possibly Chad.

Footnotes 

 

Enteromius
Taxa named by George Albert Boulenger
Fish described in 1901